
Gmina Baranów is a rural gmina (administrative district) in Grodzisk Mazowiecki County, Masovian Voivodeship, in east-central Poland. Baranów is the most possible location for the new New Central Polish Airport - planned as the biggest hub for Central and Eastern Europe.

Villages
Gmina Baranów contains the villages and settlements of Baranów, Basin, Boża Wola, Bronisławów, Buszyce, Cegłów, Drybus, Gole, Gongolina, Holendry Baranowskie, Karolina, Kaski, Kopiska, Murowaniec, Nowa Pułapina, Osiny, Regów, Stanisławów, Stara Pułapina, Strumiany, Wyczółki and Żaby.

Neighbouring gminas
Gmina Baranów is bordered by the gminas of Błonie, Grodzisk Mazowiecki, Jaktorów, Teresin and Wiskitki.

References
Polish official population figures 2006

Baranow
Grodzisk Mazowiecki County